Defending champion Victoria Azarenka defeated Li Na in the final, 4–6, 6–4, 6–3 to win the women's singles tennis title at the 2013 Australian Open.

Azarenka, Maria Sharapova and Serena Williams were in contention for the world No. 1 ranking. Azarenka retained the top ranking by winning the title after Sharapova and Williams lost in the semifinals and quarterfinals, respectively.

Seeds

Qualifying

Wildcards

Draw

Finals

Top half

Section 1

Section 2

Section 3

Section 4

Bottom half

Section 5

Section 6

Section 7

Section 8

Championship match statistics

References
General

Specific

External links
 2013 Australian Open – Women's draws and results at the International Tennis Federation

Women's Singles
Australian Open (tennis) by year – Women's singles
2013 in Australian women's sport
2013 WTA Tour